Juliane Wolf (born 26 February 1988) is a German para table tennis player who competes in international level events. She is a double World silver medalist and seven time European medalist. She competed at the 2016 Summer Paralympics where she lost in the bronze medal match to Josephine Medina.

References

External links
 
 

1988 births
Living people
Sportspeople from Eisenhüttenstadt
Paralympic table tennis players of Germany
Table tennis players at the 2016 Summer Paralympics
Table tennis players at the 2020 Summer Paralympics
German female table tennis players